Yurema Requena Juarez (born 25 November 1983) is a Spanish swimmer who competed in the 2008 Summer Olympics. She was born in Villarreal.

Notes

References

External links
 
 
 
 

1983 births
Living people
Spanish female freestyle swimmers
Spanish female long-distance swimmers
Olympic swimmers of Spain
Swimmers at the 2008 Summer Olympics